The 1920–21 NHL season was the fourth season of the National Hockey League (NHL). Four teams each played 24 games in a split season. The Quebec franchise was transferred to Hamilton, Ontario, to become the Hamilton Tigers. The Ottawa Senators won the league championship in a playoff with the Toronto St. Patricks. The Senators went on to win the Stanley Cup by defeating the Vancouver Millionaires of the Pacific Coast Hockey Association three games to two in a best-of-five series. This would be the last split season before the NHL changed its regular season and playoff formats.

League Business

Eddie Livingstone was again talking of creating a rival league and mentioned Hamilton
as a city in his league. To head this off, league president Frank Calder got the owners of the league to admit a Hamilton franchise. As Abso-Pure had built an arena, all owners agreed that it would be wise to
have a franchise in Hamilton. Because Quebec had done so badly the previous season, Calder said that Quebec's players would be given to Hamilton. Although Mike Quinn was non-committal at first, he finally sold the team to Hamilton and it became the Hamilton Tigers.

Regular season

The Tigers had some trouble signing Joe Malone from the Quebec days, but he finally did sign. The Tigers were awarded two players from the Senators, Punch Broadbent and Sprague Cleghorn by NHL president Calder, but both refused to sign with the Tigers, and eventually returned to the Senators. Cleghorn was awarded to the Toronto St. Patricks and at first balked at the move.
After the St. Patricks were defeated in the NHL playoffs, Cleghorn joined Ottawa in a deal. NHL president Frank Calder did not like this and the following season a trading deadline was instituted.

The Tigers stunned the Canadiens 5–0 in the team's first-ever game with Babe Dye starring and Howard Lockhart getting the only shutout of his NHL career. The Toronto St. Patricks lost Corbett Denneny to injuries and recalled Dye from Hamilton, giving them Mickey Roach in his place.

Corbett Denneny scored six goals in a game January 26, 1921, helping the Toronto St. Patricks to wallop the Hamilton Tigers 10–3. Cy Denneny wasn't about to let his brother steal the thunder and he scored six goals himself in a March 7 game as the Ottawa Senators hammered the Hamilton Tigers 12–5. For the first time, a brother combination had scored six goals in a game the same season.

Also on January 26, 1921, the Ottawa Senators left the ice with 5:13 to play in a game against the Montreal Canadiens. According to the Senators, referee Cooper Smeaton was one-sided in favour of the Canadiens. Smeaton let the Canadiens continue to play, allowing goals by Newsy Lalonde and Amos Arbour before calling the game. Smeaton denied the claim, stating "a referee is always paid and receives the same salary, regardless what team wins." Smeaton would resign over the incident, but was convinced to return to refereeing later in the season. The Senators were fined $500 by NHL president Frank Calder for the incident.

The Ottawa Senators won the first half of the split season while the Toronto St. Patricks won the second half.

Final standings

Playoffs

NHL Championship
After the regular season, Toronto and Ottawa played a total-goals series for the O'Brien Cup and to compete for the Stanley Cup. Ottawa won by shutting out the St. Pats in both games. Ottawa then went on to play the Vancouver Millionaires of the PCHA.

Stanley Cup Finals

The five games were played in Denman Arena, Vancouver.

Player statistics

Scoring leaders
Note: GP = Games played; G = Goals; A = Assists; Pts = Points

Source: NHL.

Leading goaltenders
GP = Games Played, GA = Goals Against, SO = Shutouts, GAA = Goals Against Average
Source: NHL

NHL Playoff scoring leader
Note: GP = Games played; G = Goals; A = Assists; Pts = Points

Awards
 O'Brien Cup – Ottawa Senators

Note:

The O'Brien Cup, still considered the championship of the NHA, was not awarded to Ottawa until November 1921. It had remained under the care of the Canadiens who had won it in 1917, until the death of their owner, George Kennedy in October 1921, when the NHL made arrangements to re-use the trophy.

Coaches
Hamilton Tigers: Joe Malone
Montreal Canadiens: Newsy Lalonde
Ottawa Senators: Pete Green
Toronto St. Patricks: George O'Donoghue

Debuts
The following is a list of players of note who played their first NHL game in 1920–21 (listed with their first team, asterisk(*) marks debut in playoffs):

The last remaining active player to kick off their NHL career this season was Leo Reise, Sr., who played his final NHL game in the 1929–30 season, although he missed the 1924–25 and 1925–26 seasons.

Last games
The following is a list of players of note that played their last game in the NHL in 1920–21 (listed with their last team):

Free agency

Transactions

See also 
 List of Stanley Cup champions
 Pacific Coast Hockey Association
 Ice hockey at the 1920 Summer Olympics
 List of pre-NHL seasons
 1920 in sports
 1921 in sports

References
 
 
 
 
 
 

Notes

External links
 NHL.com

 
NHL